Mandrem is a coastal village famous as a tourist spot in Pernem taluka in North Goa district of Goa state in India. It is 21 km from the capital Panaji.

About 

It has two main beaches: Junas and Ashvem.

The village has 11 wards.

Mandrem or Mandre, originally named as Manjrey, was converted to Mandrem by the Portuguese. The "D" is pronounced as "J" in Portuguese.

Mandrem beach 
Mandrem Beach is a white sand beach with clear water. The beach of Mandrem lies between the twin beaches of Morjim and Arambol. This beach is a quiet and peaceful beach. The beauty of Mandrem Beach is especially during the High Tide time when the seawater rushes into the Mandrem Creek or River. This Mandrem creek moves parallel to the waterline. Mandrem has a small fishing community and occasionally one might see local fishermen hauling their catch from the sea. The beach has been notified as a turtle nesting site under CRZ 2011.

Government and politics
Mandrem is part of Mandrem (Goa Assembly constituency) and North Goa (Lok Sabha constituency).

Notable residents
 Bhau Daji Lad – Sanskrit scholar, physician and antique collector. Born in Aska vaddo 
 Vasudeorao V Manjrekar – Dean of Sir J J School of Art, Mumbai 
 Jack de Souza – Violinist of the band Jack and his Jolly Boys. Later shifted to Bombay and became choir master at Andheri Church 
 Manuel de Souza – Jack de Souza's nephew, he had expertise with the clarinet, flute, saxophone and the violin and later played for Bombay's film industry.
 Joaquim de Souza – Manuel de Souza's younger brother, a musician
 Andre Gregorio Britto – Trumpeter who was a student of Jack de Souza
 Anurag Mhamal – Goa’s first chess international master

References

External links

Mandrem in photos
Mandrem Beach

Villages in North Goa district
Beaches of Goa
Beaches of North Goa district